Ilmtal-Weinstraße is a municipality in the district Weimarer Land, in Thuringia, Germany. It was named after the river Ilm, that flows through the municipality. It was formed on 31 December 2013 by the merger of the former municipalities Liebstedt, Mattstedt, Niederreißen, Niederroßla, Nirmsdorf, Oberreißen, Oßmannstedt, Pfiffelbach and Willerstedt. Before, these municipalities had cooperated in the Verwaltungsgemeinschaft ("collective municipality") Ilmtal-Weinstraße, which was disbanded. The seat of the municipality and of the former Verwaltungsgemeinschaft is in Pfiffelbach. The former municipalities Kromsdorf (which had been part of the former Verwaltungsgemeinschaft Ilmtal-Weinstraße), Rohrbach and Leutenthal were merged into Ilmtal-Weinstraße in January 2019.

Area codes:
 03644  for Mattstedt, Niederroßla and district Wersdorf of municipality Pfiffelbach
 036462 for Liebstedt, Oßmannstedt, Pfiffelbach
 036463 for Nirmsdorf, Willerstedt
 036373 for Niederreißen and Oberreißen

References

External links
 Ilmtal-Weinstraße official site

Former Verwaltungsgemeinschaften in Thuringia
Weimarer Land
Grand Duchy of Saxe-Weimar-Eisenach